Il sergente Rompiglioni ("Sergeant Rompiglioni") is a 1973 Italian comedy film directed by Giuliano Biagetti (here credited Pier Giorgio Ferretti).  The film got a great commercial success, grossing over one billion lire. It was the greatest commercial success of Franco Franchi in his solo career after the split from Ciccio Ingrassia. The film has a sequel, still starring Franchi in the title role.

Cast 

Franco Franchi: Sgt. Francesco Garibaldi Rompiglioni
Francesca Romana Coluzzi: Semiramide
Mario Carotenuto: Colonel Guglielmo
Corinne Cléry: The daughter of the Colonel (credited as Corinne Picolo)
Enzo Andronico: The Lieutenant
Nino Terzo: Lance Corporal Baffo

References

External links

Il sergente Rompicoglioni at Variety Distribution

1973 films
Italian comedy films
Military humor in film
1973 comedy films
Films directed by Giuliano Biagetti
Films scored by Berto Pisano
1970s Italian films